Shewanella gaetbuli is a Gram-negative, non-spore-forming, rod-shaped and motile bacterium from the genus of Shewanella which has been isolated from tidal flat from Korea.

References

Alteromonadales
Bacteria described in 2004